Crazy Horse (1840 – September 5, 1877) was a Lakota war leader of the Oglala band in the 19th century. He took up arms against the United States federal government to fight against encroachment by white American settlers on Native American territory and to preserve the traditional way of life of the Lakota people. His participation in several famous battles of the Black Hills War on the northern Great Plains, among them the Fetterman Fight in 1866, in which he acted as a decoy, and the Battle of the Little Bighorn in 1876, in which he led a war party to victory, earned him great respect from both his enemies and his own people.

In September 1877, four months after surrendering to U.S. troops under General George Crook, Crazy Horse was fatally wounded by a bayonet-wielding military guard while allegedly resisting imprisonment at Camp Robinson in present-day Nebraska. He was honored by the U.S. Postal Service in 1982 with a 13¢ Great Americans series postage stamp.

Early life

Sources differ on the precise year of Crazy Horse's birth, but most agree he was born between 1840 and 1845. According to Šúŋka Bloká (He Dog), he and Crazy Horse "were both born in the same year at the same season of the year," which census records and other interviews place in 1842. Ptehé Wóptuȟ’a (Encouraging Bear), an Oglala medicine man and spiritual adviser to Crazy Horse, reported that Crazy Horse was born "in the year in which the band to which he belonged, the Oglala, stole One Hundred Horses, and in the fall of the year," a reference to the annual Lakota calendar or winter count. Among the Oglala winter counts, the stealing of 100 horses is noted by Cloud Shield, and possibly by American Horse and Red Horse owner, as equivalent to the year 1840–41. Oral history accounts from relatives on the Cheyenne River Reservation place his birth in the spring of 1840. On the evening of his son's death, the elder Crazy Horse told Lieutenant H.R. Lemly that the year of birth was 1840.

Immediate family

Crazy Horse was born to parents from two different bands of the Lakota division of the Sioux, his father being an Oglala and his mother a Miniconjou. His father, born in 1810, was also named Tȟašúŋke Witkó (Crazy Horse). Crazy Horse was named Čháŋ Óhaŋ (Among the Trees) at birth, meaning he was one with nature. His mother, Tȟašína Ȟlaȟlá Wiŋ (Rattling Blanket Woman, born 1814), gave him the nickname Pȟehíŋ Yuȟáȟa (Curly Son/Curly) or Žiží (Light Hair) as his light, curly hair resembled her own. She died when Crazy Horse was only four years old.

One account said that after the son had reached maturity and shown his strength, his father gave him his name and took a new one, Waglúla (Worm). Another version of how the younger Crazy Horse acquired his name is that he took it after going through the haŋbléčheya ceremony. Crazy Horse's cousin (son of Hewáŋžiča, Lone Horn) was Maȟpíya Ičáȟtagya (Touch the Clouds). He saved Crazy Horse's life at least once and was with him when he died.

Rattling Blanket Woman or Tȟašína Ȟlaȟlá Wiŋ (1814–1844) was the daughter of Black Buffalo and White Cow (also known as Iron Cane). Her older siblings were Lone Horn (born 1790, died 1877) and Good Looking Woman (born 1810). Her younger sister was named Looks At It (born 1815), later given the name They Are Afraid of Her. The historian George Hyde wrote that Rattling Blanket Woman was Miniconjou and the sister of Spotted Tail, who became a Brulé head chief.  She may have been a member of either of the One Horn or Lone Horn families, leaders of the Miniconjou. She was said to be beautiful and a fast runner.

In 1844, while out hunting buffalo, Waglula helped defend a Lakota village under attack by the Crow. In gratitude he gave Waglula his two eldest daughters as wives: Iron Between Horns (age 18) and Kills Enemy (age 17). Corn's youngest daughter, Red Leggins, who was 15 at the time, requested to go with her sisters; all became Waglula's wives.   When Waglula returned with the new wives, Rattling Blanket Woman, who had been unsuccessful in conceiving another child, thought she had lost favor with her husband and hanged herself.  Waglula went into mourning for four years.  Rattling Blanket Woman's sister, Good Looking Woman, came to offer herself as a replacement wife, and stayed on to raise Crazy Horse.  Other versions of the legend posit that she was grief-stricken by the deaths of those she knew; that her husband accused her of running off with her brother-in-law; or that she had had affair with a European-American man.

According to Frederick Hoxie's Encyclopedia of North American Indians, Crazy Horse was the third in his male line to bear the name of Crazy Horse. The love of his life was Tȟatȟáŋkasápawiŋ (Black Buffalo Woman), whom he courted, but she married another man named Mní Níča (No Water). At one point, Crazy Horse persuaded Black Buffalo Woman to run away with him. No Water borrowed a pistol and ran after his wife. When he found her with Crazy Horse, he fired at him, injuring him in the face and leaving a noticeable scar. Crazy Horse was married two times, first to Tȟašinásápawiŋ (Black Shawl) and second to Nellie Larrabee (Laravie). Nellie Larrabee was given the task of spying on Crazy Horse for the military, so the marriage is suspect. Only Black Shawl bore him any children, a daughter named Kȟokípȟapiwiŋ (They Are Afraid of Her), who died at age three.

Visions
Crazy Horse lived in a Lakota camp in present-day Wyoming with his younger half-brother, Little Hawk, son of Iron Between Horns and Waglula. Little Hawk was the nephew of his maternal step-grandfather, Long Face, and a cousin, High Horse. In 1854, the camp was entered by Lieutenant John Lawrence Grattan and 29 other U.S. troopers, who intended to arrest a Miniconjou man for having stolen a cow. The cow had wandered into the camp, and after a short time someone butchered it and passed the meat out among the people. When the soldiers fatally shot Chief Conquering Bear, the Lakota returned fire, killing all 30 soldiers and a civilian interpreter in what was later called the Grattan massacre.

After witnessing the death of Conquering Bear at the Grattan massacre, Crazy Horse began to get trance visions. Curly went out on a vision quest to seek guidance but without going through the traditional procedures first. In his vision, a warrior on his horse rode out of a lake and the horse seemed to float and dance throughout the vision. He wore simple clothing, no face paint, his hair down with just a feather in it, and a small brown stone behind his ear. Bullets and arrows flew around him as he charged forward, but neither he nor his horse was hit. A thunderstorm came over the warrior, and his people grabbed hold of his arms trying to hold him back. The warrior broke their hold and then lightning struck him, leaving a lightning symbol on his cheek, and white marks like hailstones appeared on his body. The warrior told Curly that as long he dressed modestly, his tribesmen did not touch him, and he did not take any scalps or war trophies, then he would not be harmed in battle. As the vision ended, he heard a red-tailed hawk shrieking off in the distance. Curly’s father later interpreted the vision and said that the warrior was going to be him. The lightning bolt on his cheek and the hailstones on his body were to become his war paint. Curly was to follow the warrior’s role to dress modestly and to do as the warrior's prophecy said so he would be unharmed in battle. For the most part, the vision was true and Crazy Horse was rarely harmed in battle, except for when he was struck by an arrow after taking two enemy scalps. He was shot in the face by No Water when Little Big Man tried to hold Crazy Horse back to prevent a fight from breaking out, and he was held back by one of his tribesmen—according to some reports, Little Big Man himself—when he was stabbed by a bayonet the night he died.

His father Waglula took him to what today is Sylvan Lake, South Dakota, where they both sat to do a hemblecha or vision quest. A red-tailed hawk led them to their respective spots in the hills; as the trees are tall in the Black Hills, they could not always see where they were going. Crazy Horse sat between two humps at the top of a hill north and to the east of the lake. Waglula sat south of Black Elk Peak but north of his son.

Crazy Horse's vision first took him to the South where, in Lakota spirituality, one goes upon death. He was brought back and was taken to the West in the direction of the wakiyans (thunder beings). He was given a medicine bundle to protect him for life. One of his animal protectors would be the white owl which, according to Lakota spirituality, would give extended life. He was also shown his "face paint" for battle, to consist of a yellow lightning bolt down the left side of his face, and white powder. He would wet this and put marks over his vulnerable areas; when dried, the marks looked like hailstones. His face paint was similar to that of his father, who used a red lightning strike down the right side of his face and three red hailstones on his forehead. Crazy Horse put no make-up on his forehead and did not wear a war bonnet. Lastly, he was given a sacred song that is still sung by the Oglala people today and he was told he would be a protector of his people.

Black Elk, a contemporary and cousin of Crazy Horse, related the vision in Black Elk Speaks: Being the Life Story of a Holy Man of the Oglala Sioux, from talks with John G. Neihardt:

Crazy Horse received a black stone from a medicine man named Horn Chips to protect his horse, a black-and-white pinto he named Inyan (rock or stone). He placed the stone behind the horse's ear so that the medicine from his vision quest and Horn Chips would combine—he and his horse would be one in battle. The more accepted account, however, is that Horn Chips gave Crazy Horse a sacred stone that protected him from bullets. Subsequently, Crazy Horse was never wounded by a bullet. In addition, "Horn Chips" is not the correct name of this medicine man, though it has become a repeated error since its first publication in 1982. His Lakota name was Woptura, and he was given the name "Chips" by the government and was referred to as Old Man Chips. Horn Chips was one of his sons, who was also known as Charles Chips.

Personality
Crazy Horse was known to have a personality characterized by aloofness, shyness, modesty and lonesomeness. He was generous to the poor, the elderly, and children. In Black Elk Speaks, Neihardt relays:

War leadership

Title of "Shirt Wearer"
Through the late 1850s and early 1860s, Crazy Horse's reputation as a warrior grew, as did his fame among the Lakota. The Lakota told accounts of him in their oral histories. His first kill was a Shoshone raider who had murdered a Lakota woman washing buffalo meat along the Powder River. Crazy Horse fought in numerous battles between the Lakota and their traditional enemies, the Crow, Shoshone, Pawnee, Blackfeet, and Arikara, among Plains tribes.

In 1864, after the Third Colorado Cavalry decimated Cheyenne and Arapaho in the Sand Creek Massacre, Oglala and Minneconjou bands allied with them against the U.S. military. Crazy Horse was present at the Battle of Platte Bridge and the Battle of Red Buttes in July 1865. Because of his fighting ability and for his generosity to the tribe, in 1865 Crazy Horse was named an Ogle Tanka Un ("Shirt Wearer", or war leader) by the tribe.

Battle of the Hundred in the Hand (Fetterman Fight)
On December 21, 1866, Crazy Horse and six other warriors, both Lakota and Cheyenne, decoyed Capt. William Fetterman's 53 infantrymen and 27 cavalry troopers under Lt. Grummond into an ambush. They had been sent out from Fort Phil Kearny to follow up on an earlier attack on a wood train. Crazy Horse lured Fetterman's infantry up a hill. Grummond's cavalry followed the other six decoys along Peno Head Ridge and down toward Peno Creek, where several Cheyenne women taunted the soldiers. Meanwhile, Cheyenne leader Little Wolf and his warriors, who had been hiding on the opposite side of Peno Head Ridge, blocked the return route to the fort. The Lakota warriors swept over the hill and attacked the infantry. Additional Cheyenne and Lakota hiding in the buckbrush along Peno Creek effectively surrounded the soldiers. Seeing that they were surrounded, Grummond headed his cavalry back to Fetterman.

The combined warrior forces of nearly 1,000 killed all the US soldiers in what became known at the time to the white population as the Fetterman Massacre. It was the Army's worst defeat on the Great Plains up to that time. The Lakota and Cheyenne call it the Battle of the Hundred in the Hand.

Wagon Box Fight
On August 2, 1867, Crazy Horse participated in the Wagon Box Fight, also near Fort Phil Kearny. Lakota forces numbering between 1000 and 2000 attacked a wood-cutting crew near the fort. Most of the soldiers fled to a circle of wagon boxes without wheels, using them for cover as they fired at the Lakota.  The Lakota took substantial losses, as the soldiers were firing new breech-loading rifles. These could fire ten times a minute compared to the old muzzle-loading rate of three times a minute. The Lakota charged after the soldiers fired the first time, expecting the delay of their older muskets before being able to fire again. The soldiers suffered only five killed and two wounded while the Lakota suffered between 50 and 120 casualties. Many Lakota were buried in the hills surrounding Fort Phil Kearny in Wyoming.

Controversy over Black Buffalo Woman
In the fall of 1870, Crazy Horse invited Black Buffalo Woman to accompany him on a buffalo hunt in the Slim Buttes area of present-day northwestern South Dakota. She was the wife of No Water, who had a reputation for drinking too much. It was Lakota custom to allow a woman to divorce her husband at any time. She did so by moving in with relatives or with another man, or by placing the husband's belongings outside their lodge. Although some compensation might be required to smooth over hurt feelings, the rejected husband was expected to accept his wife's decision. No Water was away from camp when Crazy Horse and Black Buffalo Woman left for the buffalo hunt.

No Water tracked down Crazy Horse and Black Buffalo Woman in the Slim Buttes area. When he found them in a teepee, he called Crazy Horse's name from outside. When Crazy Horse answered, No Water stuck a pistol into the teepee and aimed for Crazy Horse. Touch the Clouds, Crazy Horse's first cousin and son of Lone Horn, was sitting in the teepee nearest the entry. He knocked the pistol upward as No Water fired, deflecting the bullet to Crazy Horse's upper jaw. No Water left, with Crazy Horse's relatives in hot pursuit. No Water ran his horse until it died and continued on foot until he reached the safety of his own village.

Several elders convinced Crazy Horse and No Water that no more blood should be shed. As compensation for the shooting, No Water gave Crazy Horse three horses. Because Crazy Horse was with a married woman, he was stripped of his title as Shirt Wearer (leader).

Black Shawl and Nellie Larrabee
Crazy Horse married Black Shawl, a member of the Oglala Lakota and relative of Spotted Tail. The elders sent her to heal Crazy Horse after his altercation with No Water. Crazy Horse and Black Shawl Woman were married in 1871. Black Shawl gave birth to Crazy Horse's only child, a daughter named They Are Afraid Of Her, who died in 1873. Black Shawl outlived Crazy Horse. She died in 1927 during the influenza outbreaks of the 1920s.

Red Cloud also arranged to send a young woman, Nellie Larrabee, to live in Crazy Horse's lodge. Interpreter William Garnett described Larrabee as "a half-blood, not of the best frontier variety, an invidious and evil woman". Larrabee, also referred to as Chi-Chi and Brown Eyes Woman, was the daughter of a French trader and a Cheyenne woman. Garnett's first-hand account of Crazy Horse's surrender alludes to Larrabee as the "half blood woman" who caused Crazy Horse to fall into a "domestic trap which insensibly led him by gradual steps to his destruction."

Great Sioux War of 1876–77
On June 17, 1876, Crazy Horse led a combined group of approximately 1,500 Lakota and Cheyenne in a surprise attack against brevetted Brigadier General George Crook's force of 1,000 cavalry and infantry, and allied 300 Crow and Shoshone warriors in the Battle of the Rosebud. The battle, although not substantial in terms of human losses, delayed Crook's joining the 7th Cavalry under George A. Custer. It contributed to Custer’s subsequent defeat at the Battle of the Little Bighorn.

A week later at 3:00 p.m. on June 25, 1876, Custer's 7th Cavalry attacked a large encampment of Cheyenne and Lakota bands along the Little Bighorn River, marking the beginning of his last battle. Crazy Horse's actions during the battle are unknown.

Hunkpapa warriors led by Chief Gall led the main body of the attack. Crazy Horse's tactical and leadership role in the battle remains ambiguous. While some historians think that Crazy Horse led a flanking assault, ensuring the death of Custer and his men, the only proven fact is that Crazy Horse was a major participant in the battle. His personal courage was attested to by several eye-witness Indian accounts. Water Man, one of only five Arapaho warriors who fought, said Crazy Horse "was the bravest man I ever saw. He rode closest to the soldiers, yelling to his warriors. All the soldiers were shooting at him, but he was never hit." Sioux battle participant Little Soldier said, "The greatest fighter in the whole battle was Crazy Horse."  Crazy Horse is said to have exhorted his warriors before the fight with the battle cry "Hóka-héy! Today is a good day to die!" but the quotation is inaccurately attributed. The earliest published reference is from 1881, in which the phrase is attributed to Low Dog. The English version is not an accurate translation from the Lakota language, "Hóka-héy!" Both phrases are used in context by Black Elk in Black Elk Speaks.

On September 10, 1876, Captain Anson Mills and two battalions of the Third Cavalry captured a Miniconjou village of 36 tipis in the Battle of Slim Buttes, South Dakota. Crazy Horse and his followers attempted to rescue the camp and its headman, (Old Man) American Horse, but they were unsuccessful. The soldiers killed American Horse and much of his family after they holed up in a cave for several hours.

On January 8, 1877, Crazy Horse's warriors fought their last major battle at Wolf Mountain, against the US Cavalry in the Montana Territory. His people struggled through the winter, weakened by hunger and the long cold. Crazy Horse decided to surrender with his band to protect them, and went to Fort Robinson in Nebraska.

Last Sun Dance of 1877
The Last Sun Dance of 1877 is significant in Lakota history as the Sun Dance held to honor Crazy Horse one year after the victory at the Battle of the Little Big Horn, and to offer prayers for him in the trying times ahead. Crazy Horse attended the Sun Dance as the honored guest but did not take part in the dancing. Five warrior cousins sacrificed blood and flesh for Crazy Horse at the Last Sun Dance of 1877. The five warrior cousins were three brothers, Flying Hawk, Kicking Bear and Black Fox II, all sons of Chief Black Fox, also known as Great Kicking Bear, and two other cousins, Eagle Thunder and Walking Eagle. The five warrior cousins were braves considered vigorous battle men of distinction.

Surrender and death

Crazy Horse and other northern Oglala leaders arrived at the Red Cloud Agency, located near Fort Robinson, Nebraska, on May 5, 1877. Together with He Dog, Little Big Man, Iron Crow and others, they met in a solemn ceremony with First Lieutenant William P. Clark as the first step in their formal surrender.

For the next four months, Crazy Horse resided in his village near the Red Cloud Agency. The attention that Crazy Horse received from the Army drew the jealousy of Red Cloud and Spotted Tail, two Lakota who had long before come to the agencies and adopted the white ways.  Rumors of Crazy Horse's desire to slip away and return to the old ways of life started to spread at the Red Cloud and Spotted Tail agencies. In August 1877 officers at Camp Robinson received word that the Nez Perce of Chief Joseph had broken out of their reservation in Idaho and were fleeing north through Montana toward Canada. When asked by Lieutenant Clark to join the Army against the Nez Perce, Crazy Horse and the Miniconjou leader Touch the Clouds objected, saying that they had promised to remain at peace when they surrendered. According to one version of events, Crazy Horse finally agreed, saying that he would fight "till all the Nez Perce were killed." But his words were apparently misinterpreted by a half-Tahitian scout, Frank Grouard, a person not to be confused with Fred Gerard, another U.S. Cavalry scout during the summer of 1876. Grouard reported that Crazy Horse had said that he would "go north and fight until not a white man is left." When he was challenged over his interpretation, Grouard left the council. Another interpreter, William Garnett, was brought in but quickly noted the growing tension.

With the growing trouble at the Red Cloud Agency, General George Crook was ordered to stop at Fort Robinson. A council of the Oglala leadership was called, then canceled, when Crook was incorrectly informed that Crazy Horse had said the previous evening that he intended to kill the general during the proceedings. Crook ordered Crazy Horse's arrest and then departed; leaving the post commander at Fort Robinson, Lieutenant Colonel Luther P. Bradley, to carry out his order. Additional troops were brought in from Fort Laramie. On the morning of September 4, 1877, two columns moved against Crazy Horse's village, only to find that it had scattered during the night. Crazy Horse had fled to the nearby Spotted Tail Agency with his wife, who had become ill with tuberculosis. After meeting with military officials at Camp Sheridan, the adjacent military post, Crazy Horse agreed to return to Fort Robinson with Lieutenant Jesse M. Lee, the Indian agent at Spotted Tail.

On the morning of September 5, 1877, Crazy Horse and Lieutenant Lee, accompanied by Touch the Clouds as well as a number of Indian scouts, departed for Fort Robinson. Arriving that evening outside the adjutant's office, Lieutenant Lee was informed that he was to turn Crazy Horse over to the Officer of the Day. Lee protested and hurried to Bradley's quarters to debate the issue, but without success. Bradley had received orders that Crazy Horse was to be arrested and taken under the cover of darkness to Division Headquarters. Lee turned the Oglala war chief over to Captain James Kennington, in charge of the post guard, who accompanied Crazy Horse to the post guardhouse. Once inside, Crazy Horse struggled with the guard and Little Big Man and attempted to escape. Just outside the door, Crazy Horse was stabbed with a bayonet by one of the members of the guard. He was taken to the adjutant's office, where he was tended by the assistant post surgeon at the post, Valentine McGillycuddy, and died late that night.

The following morning, Crazy Horse's body was turned over to his elderly parents, who took it to Camp Sheridan and placed it on a burial scaffold. The following month, when the Spotted Tail Agency was moved to the Missouri River, Crazy Horse's parents moved the remains to an undisclosed location. There are at least four possible locations as noted on a state highway memorial near Wounded Knee, South Dakota. His final resting place remains unknown.

Controversy over his death

McGillycuddy, who treated Crazy Horse after he was stabbed, wrote that Crazy Horse "died about midnight." According to military records, he died before midnight, making it September 5, 1877.

John Gregory Bourke's memoir of his service in the Indian wars, On the Border with Crook, describes a different account of Crazy Horse's death. He based his account on an interview with Crazy Horse's rival, Little Big Man, who was present at Crazy Horse's arrest and fatal wounding. The interview took place over a year after Crazy Horse's death.  Little Big Man said that, as Crazy Horse was being escorted to the guardhouse, he suddenly pulled two knives from under his blanket and held one in each hand. One knife was reportedly fashioned from an army bayonet. Little Big Man, standing behind him, seized Crazy Horse by both elbows, pulling his arms up behind him. As Crazy Horse struggled, Little Big Man lost his grip on one elbow, and Crazy Horse drove his own knife deep into his own lower back. The guard stabbed Crazy Horse with his bayonet in the back, who then fell and surrendered to the guards.

When Bourke asked about the popular account of the guard bayoneting Crazy Horse first, Little Big Man said that the guard had thrust with his bayonet, but that Crazy Horse's struggles resulted in the guard's thrust missing entirely and lodging his bayonet into the frame of the guardhouse door. Little Big Man said that in the hours immediately following Crazy Horse's wounding, the camp commander had suggested the story of the guard being responsible to hide Little Big Man's role in the death of Crazy Horse and avoid any inter-clan reprisals.

Little Big Man's account is questionable; it is the only one of 17 eyewitness sources (from Lakota, US Army, and "mixed-blood" individuals) that fails to attribute Crazy Horse's death to a soldier at the guardhouse. The author Thomas Powers cites various witnesses who said Crazy Horse was fatally wounded when his back was pierced by a guard's bayonet.

The identity of the soldier responsible for the bayoneting of Crazy Horse is also debated. Only one eyewitness account actually identifies the soldier as Private William Gentles. Historian Walter M. Camp circulated copies of this account to individuals who had been present who questioned the identity of the soldier and provided two additional names. To this day, the identification remains questioned.

Photograph controversy

Most sources question whether Crazy Horse was ever photographed. Valentine McGillycuddy doubted any photograph of the war leader had been taken. In 1908, Walter Camp wrote to the agent for the Pine Ridge Reservation inquiring about a portrait. "I have never seen a photo of Crazy Horse," Agent Brennan replied, "nor am I able to find any one among our Sioux here who remembers having seen a picture of him. Crazy Horse had left the hostiles but a short time before he was killed and it's more than likely he never had a picture taken of himself."

In 1956, a small tintype portrait purportedly of Crazy Horse was published by J. W. Vaughn in his book With Crook at the Rosebud. The photograph had belonged to the family of the scout Baptiste "Little Bat" Garnier. Two decades later, the portrait was published with further details about how the photograph was produced at Fort Robinson, though the editor of the book "remained unconvinced of the authenticity of the photograph."

In the late 1990s the original tintype was on exhibit at the Custer Battlefield Museum in Garryowen, Montana. The museum says that it is the only authentic portrait of Crazy Horse. Historians continue to dispute the identification.

Experts argue that the tintype was taken a decade or two after 1877. The evidence includes the individual's attire, the length of the hair pipe breastplate, and the ascot tie, which closely resembles the attire of Buffalo Bill's Wild West Indian performers active from 1883 to the early 1900s.  Other experts point out that the gradient lighting in the photo indicates a skylight studio portrait, common in larger cities.  In addition, no other photograph with the same painted backdrop has been found. Several photographers passed through Fort Robinson and the Red Cloud Agency in 1877—including James H. Hamilton, Charles Howard, David Rodocker and possibly Daniel S. Mitchell—but none used the backdrop that appears in the tintype. After the death of Crazy Horse, Private Charles Howard produced at least two images of the famed war leader's alleged scaffold grave, located near Camp Sheridan, Nebraska.

Legacy

In the view of author Chris Hedges, "there are few resistance figures in American history as noble as Crazy Horse," while adding that "his ferocity of spirit remains a guiding light for all who seek lives of defiance."

Memorials
Crazy Horse is commemorated by the incomplete Crazy Horse Memorial in the Black Hills of South Dakota, near the town of Berne. Like the nearby Mount Rushmore National Memorial, it is a monument carved out of a mountainside. The sculpture was begun by Polish-American sculptor Korczak Ziółkowski, who had worked under Gutzon Borglum on Mount Rushmore, in 1948.

Ziółkowski was inspired to create the Crazy Horse Memorial after receiving a letter from native Lakota chief Henry Standing Bear, who asked if Ziółkowski would be interested in creating a monument for the native North Americans to show that the Indian nations also have their heroes. The Native Americans consider Thunderhead Mountain, where the monument is being carved, to be sacred ground. Thunderhead Mountain is situated between Custer and Hill City.

The memorial is funded entirely by private donations, with no assistance from the U.S. federal government. There is no target completion date at this time; however, in 1998, the face of Crazy Horse was completed and dedicated. The Crazy Horse Memorial Foundation regularly takes the lead in cultural, social and educational events, including the Volksmarch, the occasion on which the public is allowed into the actual monument grounds. The foundation generates most of its funds from visitor fees, with visitors numbering more than one million annually.

The monument has been the subject of controversy. In Ziółkowski's vision, the sculpted likeness of Crazy Horse is dedicated to the spirit of Crazy Horse and all Native Americans. It is well-known that Crazy Horse did not want to be photographed during his lifetime and is reportedly buried in an undisclosed location. While Lakota chief Henry Standing Bear believed in the sincerity of the motives, many Native Americans still oppose the intended meaning of the memorial. Opponents of the monument have likened it to pollution and desecration of the landscape and environment of the Black Hills, and of the ideals of Crazy Horse himself.

Aside from the monumental sculpture, Crazy Horse has also been honored by having two highways named after him, both called the Crazy Horse Memorial Highway. In South Dakota, the designation has been applied to a portion of US 16/US 385 between Custer and Hill City, which passes by the Crazy Horse Memorial. In November 2010, Nebraska Governor Dave Heineman approved designating US 20 from Hay Springs to Fort Robinson in honor of Crazy Horse, capping a year-long effort by citizens of Chadron. The designation may extend east another 100 miles through Cherry County to Valentine.

Crazy Horse School in Wanblee, South Dakota is named after him.

In popular culture
 In the film Chief Crazy Horse (1955), directed by George Sherman, Crazy Horse is played by Victor Mature.
 In the film Crazy Horse (1995), Crazy Horse is played by Native American actor Michael Greyeyes.
 The middle-grade novel In the Footsteps of Crazy Horse (2015) by Joseph Marshall, III tells the story of a young Lakota boy who learns about Crazy Horse from his grandfather.
 An Excelsior-class Starfleet starship named after Crazy Horse appears in two episodes of Star Trek: The Next Generation.
Crazy Horse's life was the subject of a four-part series of the podcast History on Fire by historian Daniele Bolelli.

References

Further reading
 Ambrose, Stephen E. Crazy Horse and Custer: The Parallel Lives of Two American Warriors. 1975.
 Bray, Kingsley M. Crazy Horse: A Lakota Life. 2006. 
 Clark, Robert. The Killing of Chief Crazy Horse: Three Eyewitness Views by the Indian, Chief He Dog the Indian White, William Garnett the White Doctor, Valentine McGillycuddy. 1988. 
 Marshall, Joseph M. III. The Journey of Crazy Horse: A Lakota History. 2004.
 Guttmacher, Peter and David W. Baird. Ed. Crazy Horse: Sioux War Chief.   New York Philadelphia: Chelsea House, 1994. 0–120. 
 McMurtry, Larry. Crazy Horse (Penguin Lives). Puffin Books. 1999. 
 Pinn, Lionel Kitpu'se. Greengrass Pipe Dancers. 2000. 
  Powers, Thomas. The Killing of Crazy Horse. Random House, Inc. 2010. .
 Sandoz, Mari. Crazy Horse, the Strange Man of the Oglalas, a biography. 1942. 
 "Debating Crazy Horse: Is this the Famous Oglala?" Whispering Wind magazine, Vol 34 #3, 2004. A discussion on the improbability of the Garryowen photo being that of Crazy Horse (the same photo shown here). The clothing, the studio setting all date the photo 1890–1910.
 The Authorized Biography of Crazy Horse and His Family Part One: Creation, Spirituality, and the Family Tree.  DVD. William Matson and Mark Frethem, producers.  Documentary based on over 100 hours of footage shot of family oral history detailed interviews and all Crazy Horse sites.  Family had final approval on end product.  Reelcontact.com, 2006.
 The Authorized Biography of Crazy Horse and His Family Part Two: Defending the Homeland Prior to the 1868 Treaty. DVD William Matson and Mark Frethem, Producers.  Reel Contact Productions, 2007.
 Russell Freedman, The Life and Death of Crazy Horse. Holiday House. 1996.

External links

 The Final Days and Death of Crazy Horse
 PBS Biography of Crazy Horse
 A timeline of Crazy Horse's life
 Biography of Crazy Horse and His Family Part 1 DVD
 

1840s births
1877 deaths
1877 murders in the United States
Lakota leaders
Murdered Native American people
Native American history of South Dakota
Native American people of the Indian Wars
People of the Great Sioux War of 1876
Red Cloud's War
People of the American Old West
Deaths by stabbing in the United States
People murdered in Nebraska
Battle of the Little Bighorn